Patrik Lamper (born 10 March 1993) is a Slovak professional ice hockey forward who currently plays for HC Košice of the Slovak Extraliga.

He also played for HC Slovan Bratislava in the Kontinental Hockey League (KHL). He was selected and competed for Slovakia in the 2018 Winter Olympics.

Career statistics

Regular season and playoffs

International

Awards and honours

References

External links

1993 births
Living people
HC '05 Banská Bystrica players
Ice hockey players at the 2018 Winter Olympics
Slovak ice hockey forwards
Olympic ice hockey players of Slovakia
HC Slovan Bratislava players
HC Košice players
Sportspeople from Banská Bystrica
Stadion Hradec Králové players
Slovak expatriate ice hockey players in the Czech Republic